Four ships of the Royal Navy and one shore establishment have borne the name HMS Goldfinch, probably after the bird the European goldfinch:

Ships
  was a 6-gun brig launched in 1808 that became a Post Office Packet Service packet, sailing out of Falmouth, Cornwall. She was sold in 1838.
  was an  wooden screw gunboat launched on 2 February 1856 and broken up 1869.
  was a  composite gunboat launched in 1889 and sold in 1907.
  was an  launched in 1910. She was wrecked on Start Point, Sanday Island, Orkney on 18 February 1915, and subsequently broken for scrap in April 1919.

Shore establishment
 HMS Goldfinch was the name given to Ta' Qali airfield in Malta when it was transferred to the Fleet Air Arm on 1 April 1945 for use as a Fleet Requirements Unit.

References

Royal Navy ship names